William May Garland (March 31, 1866 – September 26, 1948) was the son of Jonathan May Garland and Rebecca Heagan Jewett. His real estate company contributed greatly to the growth of Los Angeles in the years before and after 1900, and he was responsible for bringing the 1932 Summer Olympics to Los Angeles for the first time.

Early history

William May Garland was born in Westport, Maine on March 31, 1866. In 1882 at age 16, he went to Boston, and by 1884 he was in Chicago. In 1890, he moved to Los Angeles working as auditor of the Pacific Cable Railway Company until 1894, when he formed his real estate business, the W. M. Garland Company, headquartered in Henry Huntington's Pacific Electric Building, which became the site of the Jonathan Club. He was Huntington's principal sales agent. In September 1895, Garland and Huntington were among the founding members of the Jonathan Club. William May Garland's granddaughter was told that when deciding the name of the club, he said "let's call it the Jonathan Club after my father" (Jonathan Garland). There are other theories on the naming of the club, but this is what William, as one of the founders, told his family.

In 1898, he traveled to New York to marry, on October 12, Sadie Blanche Hinman, daughter of Marshall Littlefield Hinman and Amanda Josephine Miller. William and Blanche had two children, William Marshall Garland and John Jewett Garland.

The Olympics

Garland was a member of the International Olympic Committee from 1922 to 1948. In 1923, he went to Rome and secured the 1932 Summer Olympics for Los Angeles, then became president of the Tenth Olympiad Committee. While in Rome, though he was an Episcopalian, he had an audience with Pope Pius XI, and was also received by the King and Queen of Italy. Other highlights among his many honors, included being Grand Marshal of the Pasadena Tournament of Roses in 1932, attending five national conventions of the G.O.P., and rejecting proposals that he stand for mayor of Los Angeles.

Death and photos

The Garland family built a summer home called Casa Ladera in Pebble Beach, California, and it was there he was stricken, and subsequently died in Monterey, California, on September 26, 1948, shortly before his 50th wedding anniversary.
There are a number of pictures available on his granddaughter's website.

References

External links
 Southern California Committee for the Olympic Games
 Art: By Invitation Only, TIME, November 1, 1937
 SCTA Hall of Fame

1866 births
1948 deaths
American real estate businesspeople
International Olympic Committee members
People from Los Angeles